is a Japanese professional baseball infielder who is currently a free agent. He has played in Nippon Professional Baseball (NPB) for the Saitama Seibu Lions.

Career
Saitama Seibu Lions selected Nagase with the forth selection in the 2011 NPB draft.

On July 15, 2012, Nagase made his NPB debut.

On December 2, 2020, he become a free agent.

References

External links

NPB.com

1993 births
Living people
Baseball people from Saga Prefecture
Japanese baseball players
Nippon Professional Baseball infielders
Saitama Seibu Lions players